Asian Highway 77 (AH77)  is a road in the Asian Highway Network running 1298 km (811 miles) from Jabal Saraj, Afghanistan to Mary, Turkmenistan. The route is as follows:

Afghanistan
 Jabal Seraj - Bamian - Harat
 Harat - Toraghundi

Turkmenistan
 Serhetabad - Mary

Asian Highway Network

Roads in Turkmenistan
Roads in Afghanistan